Jeremiah Thoronka is an innovator and entrepreneur with intimate knowledge of energy, climate change, environment, sustainability and development.

Education 
Thoronka joined the African Leadership University in Rwanda as part of its founding class. He studied Global Challenges, a program that was modelled after the SDG.

Career 
Thoronka focused on Climate Action, Energy and Innovations. He researched sociocultural and technical energy efficiency issues.He founded Optim Energy, a start-up that explored piezoelectricity to generate clean and affordable energy for those most vulnerable in society. He served as a Global Youth Ambassador for Theirword, a Deloitte Climate Scholar and Ambassador at One Young World and was also Chattering President of Rotaract Club of ALU Rwanda. Thoronka was selected to join the Climate Overshoot Commission Youth Engagement Group, an organisation of eminent leaders working on strategies on how to reduce risks if the world exceeds its Paris climate commitments by 2030.

References